The Whitemud River is a small, highly meandering river in southwest Manitoba. It begins at the junction of Stony Creek and Boggy Creek in Neepawa, and flows east to Arden, Gladstone, Westbourne, discharging into Lake Manitoba at Lynchs Point.
Other major streams feeding the river include the Big Grass River, Pine Creek, Squirrel Creek, Westbourne Drain and Rat Creek.

The precise origin of the name is not known. The fur trader Alexander Henry referred to it as Rivier Terre Blanche, meaning "White Earth River". Geographic Board of Canada correspondence from a Mr. Garrioch of Portage la Prairie in 1905 indicates that the river got its name from the colour of the clay and soil along its banks.

The river's depth ranges from a few centimeters in the summer to several meters in flood events. Fish species known to inhabit the river include northern pike, white suckers, flathead minnows, emerald shiners, common carp and walleye.

Flows vary dramatically from year to year.

See also
List of rivers of Manitoba

References

Rivers of Manitoba